Whitewater Resource Editor was an early resource editor developed by the Whitewater Group for Microsoft Windows 3.11. The WYSIWYG editor allowed resources to be edited, created, and managed including accelerator keys, bit maps, cursor shapes, icons, dialog boxes, menus, and more.

The editor was included with Turbo Pascal, Zortech C++, Borland C++, and other SDKs/IDEs.

References

Further reading
 An interesting tool: BRW(32-bit reverse engineering), May 1997, Fravia <<< broken suspicious link
 , 131 pages

Programming tools for Windows